Charles Geoffrey Wylie  OBE (24 December 1919 – 18 July 2007) was a British Army lieutenant colonel who served with 10th Gurkha Rifles  and was the organising secretary to the 1953 British Mount Everest expedition.

Wylie was also an early member of the Army Mountaineering Association, membership number 142, joining in April 1958 shortly after the Association's inauguration in 1957. He was appointed OBE in the 1995 New Year Honours.

References

British Indian Army officers
English mountain climbers
Officers of the Order of the British Empire
1919 births
2007 deaths
Indian Army personnel of World War II
Royal Gurkha Rifles officers